The Friedrichshafen Stadt–Friedrichshafen Hafen railway (or Friedrichshafen City–Friedrichshafen Port railway; German: Bahnstrecke Friedrichshafen Stadt–Friedrichshafen Hafen) is a standard gauge and non-electrified railway line in the city of Friedrichshafen in the German state of Baden-Württemberg. It connects the town station with the port station. The 816 metre-long branch line has its own VzG route number, 4531, although operationally it is a connection between two parts of the same station.

History 

After Friedrichshafen had been connected to the first section of the Ulm–Friedrichshafen railway in 1847, the Royal Württemberg State Railways (Königlich Württembergische Staats-Eisenbahnen) began on the construction of the extension towards the port in 1849. The new line to the shore of Lake Constance finally opened on 1 June 1850. Its maximum gradient is 1:45 and its minimum curve radius is 150 metre. Its main purpose continues to be to link the German railway network and the international Friedrichshafen–Romanshorn ferry line. Until 1974 there was a train ferry to Switzerland. The line has been electrified since December 2021.

Operations

The line belongs to Deutsche Bahn. In addition to carrying DB regional trains, it has been used since 1 June 1997 by the railcars of the private Bodensee-Oberschwaben-Bahn (BOB) between city and port stations, which have to reverse in the city station. In terms of fares, the connection – like all lines in the region – has been integrated into the Bodensee-Oberschwaben Verkehrsverbund (Bodensee-Oberschwaben transport association, bodo), which was founded on 1 January 2004, from the start.

References

Footnotes

Sources

 (reprint of 1895 edition)

External links 
1944 timetable

Railway lines in Baden-Württemberg
Railway lines opened in 1850
Buildings and structures in Bodenseekreis
Friedrichshafen